Rizalista is a collective term which refers to a cult whose members associate themselves with José Rizal, an important figure of the Philippine Revolution. About 200 Rizalista groups exist in the Philippines, many of which are based in Rizal's hometown of Calamba, Laguna. Some of these groups are non-governmental organizations which aims to live Rizal's ideals through civic programs while some are spiritual in nature giving spiritual or religious importance to Rizal.

See also
Knights of Rizal
Rizalista religious movements

References

José Rizal
Organizations based in the Philippines